Langrune-sur-Mer (literally Langrune on Sea) is a commune in the Calvados department in the Normandy region in northwestern France.

Population

International relations
The commune is twinned with Fishbourne, UK since 1998.

See also
Communes of the Calvados department

References

Communes of Calvados (department)
Calvados communes articles needing translation from French Wikipedia
Populated coastal places in France